The 2000 United States Senate election in Indiana was held on November 7, 2000. Incumbent Republican U.S. Senator Richard Lugar was re-elected to his fifth six-year term.

Major candidates

Democratic 
 David Johnson, attorney and adviser to Gov. Frank O'Bannon

Republican 
 Richard Lugar, incumbent U.S. Senator

Campaign

Debates
Complete video of debate, August 30, 2000

Results 
Lugar easily won reelection taking 66.5% one of the largest margins in a statewide race in Indiana history. Johnson did win Lake County, a Democratic stronghold, by a wide margin, but Lugar did well elsewhere. Lugar was sworn in for a fourth term on January 3, 2001.

By county 
Lugar won 91 of Indiana's 92 counties, Johnson won only the Democratic stronghold of Lake County.

See also 
 2000 United States Senate elections

References 

2000
Indiana
2000 Indiana elections